Franz Unterlechner (born October 4, 1891, date of death unknown) was an Austrian skeleton racer who competed in the late 1920s. He finished sixth in the men's skeleton event at the 1928 Winter Olympics in St. Moritz.

References
1928 men's skeleton results
Skeletonsport.com profile
Wallechinsky, David (1984). "Skeleton (Cresta Run)". The Complete Book of the Olympics: 1896-1980. New York: Penguin Books. p. 576.

1891 births
Year of death missing
Austrian male skeleton racers
Olympic skeleton racers of Austria
Skeleton racers at the 1928 Winter Olympics